Blackiston Mill is an unincorporated community located in Floyd County, Indiana at latitude 38.336 and longitude -85.798.

B. F. Blackiston once owned a mill in the community.

References

Unincorporated communities in Floyd County, Indiana
Unincorporated communities in Indiana